Reginald Dewayne Williams (born August 29, 1960) is an American baseball coach and former outfielder, who is the current head baseball coach of the Alcorn State Braves. He played college baseball at Southern from 1979 to 1982 and played in Major League Baseball (MLB) for 4 seasons from 1985 to 1988.

Williams was born in Memphis, Tennessee. After graduation from high school, he enrolled at Southern University and played outfield for the Jaguars. He was drafted in the 6th round of the 1981 Major League Baseball draft by the St. Louis Cardinals, but returned to school for a senior season.

The Los Angeles Dodgers selected Williams in the 13th round of the 1982 Major League Baseball draft. He played 4 years in the MLB, with Los Angeles from 1985 to 1987, and the Cleveland Indians in 1988.

On August 20, 2021, Williams was named the head baseball coach at Alcorn State.

Head coaching record

References

External links
 or Retrosheet, or Pura Pelota (Venezuelan Winter League)

1960 births
Living people
Acereros de Monclova players
African-American baseball coaches
African-American baseball players
Albuquerque Dukes players
American expatriate baseball players in Mexico
Baseball coaches from Tennessee
Baseball players from Memphis, Tennessee
Buffalo Bisons (minor league) players
Charlotte Rangers players
Cleveland Indians players
Colorado Springs Sky Sox players
Lethbridge Dodgers players
Los Angeles Dodgers players
Major League Baseball outfielders
Minor league baseball coaches
Oklahoma City 89ers players
San Antonio Dodgers players
Southern Jaguars baseball players
Tigres de Aragua players
American expatriate baseball players in Venezuela
Vero Beach Dodgers players
Alcorn State Braves baseball coaches
21st-century African-American people
20th-century African-American sportspeople